Prout's hypothesis was an early 19th-century attempt to explain the existence of the various chemical elements through a hypothesis regarding the internal structure of the atom.  In 1815 and 1816, the English chemist William Prout published two papers in which he observed that the atomic weights that had been measured for the elements known at that time appeared to be whole multiples of the atomic weight of hydrogen.  He then hypothesized that the hydrogen atom was the only truly fundamental object, which he called protyle, and that the atoms of other elements were actually groupings of various numbers of hydrogen atoms.

Prout's hypothesis was an influence on Ernest Rutherford when he succeeded in "knocking" hydrogen nuclei out of nitrogen atoms with alpha particles in 1917, and thus concluded that perhaps the nuclei of all elements were made of such particles (the hydrogen nucleus), which in 1920 he suggested be named protons, from the suffix  for particles, added to the stem of Prout's word "protyle". The assumption as discussed by Rutherford was of a nucleus consisting of Z + N = A protons plus N electrons somehow trapped within thereby reducing the positive charge to +Z as observed and vaguely explaining beta decay radioactivity. Such a nuclear constitution was known to be inconsistent with dynamics either classical or early quantum but seemed inevitable until the neutron hypothesis by Rutherford and discovery by English physicist James Chadwick.

The discrepancy between Prout's hypothesis and the known variation of some atomic weights to values far from integral multiples of hydrogen, was explained between 1913 and 1932 by the discovery of isotopes and the neutron. According to the whole number rule of Francis Aston, Prout's hypothesis is correct for atomic masses of individual isotopes, with an error of at most 1%.

Influence
Prout's hypothesis remained influential in chemistry throughout the 1820s. However, more careful measurements of the atomic weights, such as those compiled by Jacob Berzelius in 1828 or Edward Turner in 1832, disproved the hypothesis.  In particular, the atomic weight of chlorine, which is 35.45 times that of hydrogen, could not at the time be explained in terms of Prout's hypothesis. Some came up with the ad hoc claim that the basic unit was one-half of a hydrogen atom, but further discrepancies surfaced. This resulted in the hypothesis that one-quarter of a hydrogen atom was the common unit. Although they turned out to be wrong, these conjectures catalyzed further measurement of atomic weights.

The discrepancy in the atomic weights was by 1919 suspected to be the result of the natural occurrence of multiple isotopes of the same element. F. W. Aston discovered multiple stable isotopes for numerous elements using a mass spectrograph. In 1919, Aston studied neon with sufficient resolution to show that the two isotopic masses are very close to the integers 20 and 22, and that neither is equal to the known molar mass (20.2) of neon gas.

By 1925, the problematic chlorine was found to be composed of the isotopes 35Cl and 37Cl, in proportions such that the average weight of natural chlorine was about 35.45 times that of hydrogen. For all elements, each individual isotope of mass number A was eventually found to have a mass very close to A times the mass of a hydrogen atom, with an error always less than 1%. This is a near miss to Prout's law being correct. Nevertheless, the rule was not found to predict isotope masses better than this for all isotopes, due mostly to mass defects resulting from release of binding energy in atomic nuclei when they are formed.

Although all elements are the product of nuclear fusion of hydrogen into higher elements, it is now understood that atoms consist of both protons (hydrogen nuclei) and neutrons. The modern version of Prout's rule is that the atomic mass of an isotope of proton number (atomic number) Z and neutron number N is equal to sum of the masses of its constituent protons and neutrons, minus the mass of the nuclear binding energy, the mass defect. According to the whole number rule proposed by Francis Aston, the mass of an isotope is roughly, but not exactly, its mass number A (Z + N) times an atomic mass unit (u), plus or minus binding energy discrepancy – atomic mass unit being the modern approximation for "mass of a proton, neutron, or hydrogen atom". For example iron-56 atoms (which have among the highest binding-energies) weigh only about 99.1% as much as 56 hydrogen atoms. The missing 0.9% of mass represents the energy lost when the nucleus of iron was made from hydrogen inside a star (see stellar nucleosynthesis).

Literary allusions
In his 1891 novel The Doings of Raffles Haw, Arthur Conan Doyle talks about turning elements into other elements of decreasing atomic number, until a gray matter is reached.

In his 1959 novel Life and Fate, Vasily Grossman's  principal character, the physicist Viktor Shtrum, reflects on Prout's hypothesis about hydrogen being the origin of other elements (and the felicitous fact that Prout's incorrect data led to an essentially correct conclusion), as he worries about his inability to formulate his own thesis.

See also 

 Binding energy

References
Footnotes

Citations

Further reading

External links
 The Semiempirical Formula for Atomic Masses

History of chemistry
Discoverers of chemical elements
1810s in science
1815 in science
1816 in science